The 2023 Speedway Grand Prix season is the 29th season of the Speedway Grand Prix era, and will decide the 78th FIM Speedway World Championship. It will be the second series promoted by Discovery Sports Events.

Bartosz Zmarzlik is the defending champion, having won the 2022 title.

Qualification 
For the 2023 season there will be 15 permanent riders, who will be joined at each Grand Prix by one wild card and two track reserves.

The top six riders from the 2022 championship qualify automatically. These riders will be joined by the three riders who qualified via the Grand Prix Challenge. 

The final six riders were nominated by series promoters, Discovery Sports Events.

Qualified riders

Qualified substitutes 
The following riders were nominated as substitutes:

Calendar
The 2023 season consists of 10 events.

See also
 2023 Individual Long Track World Championship
 2023 Speedway of Nations

References

External links 
 Speedway World Championships

2023
Grand Prix
 
Speedway Grand Prix